Piave can refer to:
 Francesco Maria Piave (1810–1876), Italian librettist, journalist and theater impresario
 Piave cheese
 Piave (river), in north Italy
 Battle of Piave River (1809), a May 1809 battle of the Napoleonic Wars
 Battle of the Piave River, a June 1918 battle of World War I
 10 Motorised Division Piave, an Italian division of World War II